The 2018 Hessian state election was held on 28 October 2018 to elect the members of the Landtag of Hesse. The outgoing government was a coalition of the Christian Democratic Union (CDU) and The Greens led by Minister-President Volker Bouffier.

The election was held two weeks after the 2018 Bavarian state election, which saw the CSU and Social Democratic Party (SPD) suffer major losses, with third parties making major gains. The result in Hesse was largely similar, with the CDU and SPD losing more than 20 percentage points between them, while the Greens and Alternative for Germany (AfD) gained approximately 9 points each. The Free Democratic Party (FDP) and The Left also made gains. Compared to the 2013 election turnout fell by 5.9 points to 67.3%.

Despite suffering the worst losses of any party, the CDU remained the largest party by a comfortable margin. The Greens and SPD each won 29 seats and 19.8% of the vote; the Greens moved into second place by an extremely narrow margin of just 66 votes. The AfD, which failed to win seats in 2013, won 13.1% and 19 seats. By entering the Landtag in Hesse, it became the only third party present in all sixteen state parliaments.

The election was influenced by the poor condition of the federal government in the aftermath of the "asylum quarrel" in June/July and the crisis around Hans-Georg Maaßen in September. One day after the election, federal Chancellor Angela Merkel announced that she would not seek re-election as CDU leader at the party convention in early December, nor seek her party's nomination as Chancellor candidate for the next federal election.

The incumbent CDU–Green government was returned with a slim majority of one seat, and was subsequently renewed.

Background 
The incumbent Hesse government coalition consisted of CDU and the Greens.

The regional election for Hesse, along with the Bavarian state election held just two weeks before, was widely seen as a test for the ruling CDU/CSU and SPD coalition of Angela Merkel's fourth federal cabinet.

Parties
The table below lists parties represented in the previous Landtag of Hesse.

Opinion polling

Results

|- bgcolor=#E9E9E9
|-
| colspan=16|
|-
! colspan="2" rowspan="2" | Party
! colspan="5" |Constituency
! colspan="5" |Party list
! colspan="3" | Total seats
|-
!Votes
!%
!+/−
!Seats
!+/−
!Votes
!%
!+/−
!Seats
!+/−
!Seats
!+/−
!%
|-
|style="width: 1px" bgcolor= align="center" | 
|  align="left"  |Christian Democratic Union (CDU)
|  align="right" | 843,068
|  align="right" | 29.3%
|  align="right" | 
|  align="right" | 40
|  align="right" |
|  align="right" | 776,910
|  align="right" | 27.0%
|  align="right" | 
|  align="right" | 0
|  align="right" | 
|  align="right" | 40
|  align="right" | 
|  align="right" | 29.2%
|-
|style="width: 1px" bgcolor= align="center" | 
|  align="left"  | Alliance '90/The Greens (Grünen)
|  align="right" | 517,904
|  align="right" | 18.0%
|  align="right" | 
|  align="right" | 5
|  align="right" | 
|  align="right" | 570,512
|  align="right" | 19.8%
|  align="right" | 
|  align="right" | 24
|  align="right" | 
|  align="right" | 29
|  align="right" | 
|  align="right" | 21.2%
|-
|style="width: 1px" bgcolor= align="center" | 
|  align="left"  | Social Democratic Party (SPD)
|  align="right" | 670,637
|  align="right" | 23.3%
|  align="right" | 
|  align="right" | 10
|  align="right" | 
|  align="right" | 570,446
|  align="right" | 19.8%
|  align="right" | 
|  align="right" | 19
|  align="right" | 
|  align="right" | 29
|  align="right" | 
|  align="right" | 21.2%
|-
|style="width: 1px" bgcolor= align="center" | 
|  align="left"  |Alternative for Germany (AfD)
|  align="right" | 362,210
|  align="right" | 12.6%
|  align="right" | 
|  align="right" | 0
|  align="right" | 
|  align="right" | 378,692
|  align="right" | 13.1%
|  align="right" | 
|  align="right" | 19
|  align="right" | 
|  align="right" | 19
|  align="right" | 
|  align="right" | 13.9%
|-
|style="width: 1px" bgcolor= align="center" | 
|  align="left"  | Free Democratic Party (FDP)
|  align="right" | 205,384
|  align="right" | 7.1%
|  align="right" | 
|  align="right" | 0
|  align="right" | 
|  align="right" | 215,946
|  align="right" | 7.5%
|  align="right" | 
|  align="right" | 11
|  align="right" | 
|  align="right" | 11
|  align="right" | 
|  align="right" | 8.0%
|-
|style="width: 1px" bgcolor= align="center" | 
|  align="left"  | The Left (Die Linke)
|  align="right" | 164,535
|  align="right" | 5.7%
|  align="right" | 
|  align="right" | 0
|  align="right" | 
|  align="right" | 181,332
|  align="right" | 6.3%
|  align="right" | 
|  align="right" | 9
|  align="right" | 
|  align="right" | 9
|  align="right" | 
|  align="right" | 6.6%
|-
|style="width: 1px" bgcolor= align="center" | 
|  align="left"  | Others
|  align="right" | 109,332
|  align="right" | 4.0%
|  align="right" | ±0
|  align="right" | 0
|  align="right" | ±0
|  align="right" | 187,423
|  align="right" | 6.5%
|  align="right" | ±0
|  align="right" | 0
|  align="right" | ±0
|  align="right" | 0
|  align="right" | ±0
|  align="right" | 0%
|-
! colspan=2| Total
! 2,873,070
! 100.0%
! 
! 55
! 
! 2,881,261
! 100.0%
! 
! 82
!
! 137
! 
! 100%
|}

State government formation
Despite heavy losses inflicted on the party, the CDU returned to government after negotiating a coalition agreement with the Greens, the second consecutive such arrangement between the two parties. The two parties formed the narrowest possible majority in the Landtag, occupying 69 seats. As part of the agreement, the Greens increased their representation in the Cabinet, holding four of the eleven portfolios. The returned coalition only became possible after a recount of votes took place several weeks after the election, due to computer glitches which affected some election night results. Following the recount, the state election commissioner announced that compared to the provisional figures, there were no significant shifts in the percentages, and the distribution of seats in the state parliament had not changed.

References

External links 

 Hessischer Landeswahlleiter (Official website, German language)
 Wahlumfragen zur Landtagswahl in Hessen (wahlrecht.de)
 KOALITIONSVERTRAG (Text of the CDU/Greens Coalition Agreement, German)

2018 elections in Germany
2018
October 2018 events in Germany